Den mörka sanningen - En berättelse om kärlek och omsorg, svek och mod (Swedish: The Dark Truth - A Story About Love and Care, Fraud and Gallantry) is a love- and crime novel by Norwegian-Swedish author Margit Sandemo from 2001. Forerunner of this novel is a serial in a magazine published short novel called Sanningen (Swedish: The Truth). The clue and characters of Sanningen are same as in the Den mörka sanningen, it's just the extended version from that story. Den mørke sannheten is the novel's Norwegian name. In Norway Den mörka sanningen has published as part of Spesial bøker (Special Books) -series, which is assembled of novels by many writers. Norwegian translation is by Unni Wenche Tandberg.

Plot 
Scene of the novel is Norway in year 1911. Nineteen-year-old shopkeepersdaughter Cornelia Weding has lived with a terrifying and inexplicable memory since the age of five. She has tried to deny it, but it comes back recurrently into her mind in the shape of feelings, words and nightmares. In the memory fragments she wanders as a child alone in the hard of night-time and dark forest and searching for something or the enormous and frightening figures in the black capes stays round her baby bed and threaten to kill her if she would remember.

As her misfortune, her beloved childhood friend will marry her beautiful and evil cousin. When she takes a trip to their weddings her stepmother's childhood home, she realizes that she has returned to the place where the dark mystery happened fourteen years ago...

Characters:
 Cornelia Weding, the principal character. Nineteen-year-old shopkeeper's daughter, who lives with her traumatic memory. Has light strawberry red hair, childish face and surprise of the all world in her wise eyes.
 Anna Weding, 24 years old, Cornelia's elder sister. Has the darker hair and skin than Cornelia. Brave, straightforward and outspoken. Her and a lieutenant Sofus Hallgren are seeing each other.
 Pontus Weding, 26 years old, Cornelia's and Anna's elder brother. Pontus has grew up the lamppost, very long and inflexible man. He studies.
 Jon, 29 years old, a neighbour boy from childhood of Cornelia and her secret love, who will marry Cornelia's cousin Missy. Studies farming far from home.
 Lars, 26 years old, Jon's younger brother. Silent, interested in cars and has one.
 Mari-Lise, called "Missy", 26 years old, a cat woman, the Cornelia's and Anna's and Pontus' cousin. However, she's not a relative of theirs, because she is the niece of brother's and sister's stepmother. Beautiful and evil seductress; has thick and copper red hair. She hates Cornelia.
 Sofus Hallgren, lieutenant, Anna's dearly loved. Visits often in the shore owned by Cornelia's father.
 Christoffer Weding, shopkeeper and Cornelia's, Anna's, Pontus' and two little children's father. The sensible and understanding man.
 Matilda Weding is his wife, but three eldest siblings of the committee of five children flock isn't her, because their mother died when Cornelia was born. Matilda is a nagging, silly and vain woman, who favours just her own relatives (especially her niece Missy). She thinks that her family is the better people complete to Wedings because of their noble birth (her grandmother was a noblewoman).
 Hans and Grethe, Matilda's and Christoffer's two little children. Don't play great role in the novel; they are only sweet and laborious, final turns in the family.
 Agnes, Matilda's sister and Missy's mother who has cold, ice blue eyes. She is married with the rich and imposing Knut Jörgen. Agnes' personality is quite similar to her sister's.
 Knut Jörgen, the rich and imposing, authority figure in the family, who get married with Agnes after that her former husband went missing. Even though he looks externally a firm and decisive man, he yields without difficulty to his wife's complaining and spoils too much his vain half daughter.
 Grandmother, who hasn't a proper noun in the novel. She wears an old-fashioned black dress, haughty and dignifiedly behaving old lady who doesn't consider her daughter's husband candidates by fair means if they don't come from enough noble estate. However, she has a heart under her hard exterior and has more sense than her silly daughters has altogether.
 Alfred Pettersen, the Agnes' former husband and Missy's father. The grandmother didn't like him. A pretty rascal, and no-one has ever heard about him since he escaped with circus ballerina many years ago.

2001 Norwegian novels
Crime novels
Fiction set in 1911
Norwegian historical novels
Historical romance novels
Norwegian romance novels
Novels by Margit Sandemo
Novels set in Norway
Swedish romance novels